Obrenovac is a municipality of the city of Belgrade. According to the 2011 census results, the municipality has a population of 71,419 inhabitants, while the urban area has 24,568 inhabitants.

The largest Serbian thermal power plant TPP Nikola Tesla is located on the outskirts of the municipality. Obrenovac was also submerged and completely evacuated during the 2014 Southeast Europe floods.

Geography
Obrenovac is situated 30 km south-west of central Belgrade near bends of the river Sava to the north. The river Kolubara flows to the east of the town on its way to join the Sava.

Apart from the town, it consists of the following villages:

Some of the neighborhoods in the town are Topolice, Rojkovac, Dudovi, Rvati, Muzička kolonija, Sljivice, Belo polje, Gaj and Stočnjak.

History
In the Middle Ages, the area was part of Serbian states. King of Srem Dragutin Nemanjić ruled it between 1282 and 1319, and established monasteries in Grabovac and Mislođin. In 1521, it was conquered by the Ottoman Empire, who ruled it for the next 300 years. Subsequently, it was site of numerous battles in frequent Ottoman–Habsburg wars and often changed hands. Austrian Regent of Serbia Charles Alexander, Duke of Württemberg built a summer house in nearby village of Stubline (then Neudorf). During a period of Austrian rule, between 1688. and 1717, the town was called Zweibrücken ('two bridges'), and during the Turkish rule it was called Palež ('arson'), possibly as a reference to frequent looting and fires it was subjected to.

On 11 April 1815, during the Second Serbian Uprising, the town was burned to the ground by Serbian forces in a battle against Ottomans. It was restored in 1859 by prince of Serbia Miloš Obrenović, after whom it was named. The Municipality of Obrenovac was incorporated within community of Belgrade municipalities in 1957.

The Day of the Municipality is December 20, the date of the decree of Prince Miloš Obrenović by which the name of Obrenovac was instituted, and its patron day is the Holy Trinity.

Obrenovac was Serbian town which suffered the greatest damage by the unprecedented floods in May 2014. Most of the population has been evacuated to safety. Sudden surge of water from Kolubara river on May 15 devastated the town, killing at least 14 persons, with several persons still missing.

Demographics

According to the 2011 census results, the municipality of Obrenovac has a population of 72,524 inhabitants.

Ethnic groups
The ethnic composition of the municipality:

Economy
The largest Serbian thermal power plant TPP Nikola Tesla is located on the outskirts of the town; its chimney is widely visible as the surrounding area is generally flat.

Touristic facilities include the Zabran forest on the right bank of the Sava. It is located outside of the urban zone of Obrenovac, northeast of the town and west of the Kolubara's mouth into the Sava. It is also accessible by boat as it has a peer. The pathways and bicycle path connect Zabran and the beach Perilo on the Sava. Under the name Obrenovački Zabran, the area is protected as the natural monument. The forest is one of the rare remaining autochthonous high forests in the floodplains of the Sava and Kolubara river. It influences the microclimate and mitigates the bad aftermaths of the Obrenovac's high level of industrialization.

Present forests developed after the area was cut clean in 1941 and 1942, and are mostly short-lived sprout forests of low quality. More quality groves of pedunculate oak and narrow-leafed ash, once omnipresent and dominant in the entire Sava valley, are preserved for its genetic importance. Also dwindling is the presence of other species of higher quality, like silver poplar, grey poplar, European white elm, field elm and European wild pear. Autochthonous species are threatened by the later introduced and fast spreading species, like American ash, Canadian poplar, box elder, common milkweed, common ragweed, annual fleabane and, especially invasive, desert false indigo. They are gradually being replaced with the older species.

Not far from the Zabran is the hotel "Obrenovac", located at the entry into the town from the Belgrade direction. The hotel has thermal springs, outdoor and indoor Olympic swimming pools, aqua park and sports complex. The spa with sulfuric water is active since c.1900. In the village of Skela, in the western section of the municipality, there is a popular attraction of ethno-yard which includes the mini-zoo. Other green areas include another protected natural monument, "Group of pedunculate oaks at Jozić cabin", which are over 200 years old, Arboretum with exotic and autochthonous plants, and the Natural History Home. There is also a game hunting ground "Posavina" in the municipality.

There is a green market in the centre of the town, and also flea market (as of August 2006) to the south of the town on the Valjevo road. The most famous football club from Obrenovac is FK Radnički Obrenovac; its stadium is beside the Belgrade road. The oldest school in the town is found next to Topolice. It carries the name of Jovan Popović. The school was built by Miloš Obrenović.

The following table gives a preview of total number of registered people employed in legal entities per their core activity (as of 2018):

Education 
Obrenovac High School

Public transport 
Three bus lines connect Obrenovac with Belgrade: 860, 860E and 861A.

International cooperation 
Obrenovac is twinned with following cities and municipalities:
 Kumanovo, North Macedonia
 Staré Mesto, Slovakia
 Bergen, Norway

Notable people 
 Zoran Radojičić, former member of the National Assembly of Serbia
 Milan Stanković

See also 
List of cities in Serbia
Obrenović Dynasty (Serbian Kings)
Subdivisions of Belgrade
List of Belgrade neighborhoods and suburbs

References

External links 

 

 
Municipalities of Belgrade
Suburbs of Belgrade
Šumadija